Joan Donovan (born 1979/1980) is an American social scientist researcher and lecturer at Harvard Kennedy School at Harvard University, an affiliate at Data and Society, and is research director of the Technology and Social Change Research Project at the Shorenstein Center on Media, Politics and Public Policy.  

Donovan's expertise is in examining internet and technology studies, online extremism, media manipulation, and disinformation campaigns, and in January 2020, she was called to testify at the Hearing on "Americans at Risk: Manipulation and Deception in the Digital Age" at Congress's Subcommittee on Consumer Protection and Commerce of the Committee on Energy and Commerce. As Director,  she published a number of impactful research papers and books. Donovan co-wrote a widely-read study that discovered that a significant number of participants in the January 6 attack on the Capitol were driven by their support for President Trump. In September of the same year, Donovan released a book titled "Meme Wars: The Untold Story of the Online Battles Upending Democracy in America," which explores the spread of right-wing political conspiracy theories through online media. In 2022, it was announced that her research project would end in 2024.

Biography 
Donovan earned her PhD in Sociology and Science Studies from the University of California San Diego, and was a Post Doctoral Fellow at the Institute for Society and Genetics at UCLA where her expertise was social movements, technology, and white supremacist's use of DNA ancestry tests. She later held the role of Research Lead for the Media Manipulation Initiative at Data and Society, and mapped how interest groups, governments, political operatives, corporations, and others use the internet and media to disrupt social institutions. After Data and Society, Donovan went on to lead the Technology and Social Change Research Project at Harvard Kennedy School and teach the class Media Manipulation and Disinformation Campaigns. Donovan has authored over 35 articles, paper, and books  including:

 How news organizations should cover white supremacist shootings, PBS NewsHour
 Big Tech Companies Are Struggling With How To Best Police Their Platforms, NPR
 Unlike Us Reader: Social Media Monopolies and Their Alternatives
 Navigating the Tech Stack: When, Where and How Should we Moderate Content?
 Toward a Militant Ethnography of Infrastructure: Cybercartographies of Order, Scale, and Scope across the Occupy Movement.

References

External links 
Harvard profile

American sociologists
American women sociologists
Internet theorists
Harvard Kennedy School faculty
Year of birth missing (living people)
Living people
University of California, San Diego alumni
21st-century American women